The tribe Neotragini comprises the dwarf antelopes of Africa:

 Dorcatragus
 Beira D. megalotis
 Madoqua
 Günther's dik-dik M. guentheri
 Kirk's dik-dik M. kirkii
 Silver dik-dik M. piacentinii
 Salt's dik-dik M. saltiana
 Neotragus
 Royal antelope N. pygmaeus
 Ourebia
 Oribi O. ourebi
 Raphicerus
 Steenbok R. campestris
 Cape grysbok R. melanotis
 Sharpe's grysbok R. sharpei

Some mammalogists (Haltenorth, 1963) considered this group as a distinct subfamily (Neotraginae).

References

 
True antelopes
Mammal tribes
Bovidae